Setlutlu was a Queen as a consort of King Sebetwane, chief of Makololo tribe. She is also known as Masekeletu.

Her brother-in-law was the king Mbololo.

Biography 
Sebetwane originally awarded Setlutlu to Lechae, one of his young commanders. Later she married Sebetwane. She bore him a son Sekeletu, who later became a ruler.

David Livingstone met the queen at Naliele. She had much influence over the commanders that Sibituane left.

Setlutlu was a grandmother of Princes Litali and Sesane.

Literature
Makololo interregnum and the legacy of David Livingstone (PDF)

African queens
South African chiefs
African queen mothers
Royalty of Barotseland